North Carolina's 24th House district is one of 120 districts in the North Carolina House of Representatives. It has been represented by Republican Ken Fontenot since 2023.

Geography
Since 2023, the district has included all of Wilson County, as well as part of Nash County. The district overlaps with the 4th and 11th Senate districts.

District officeholders since 1983

Multi-member district

Single-member district

Election results

2022

2020

2018

2016

2014

2012

2010

2008

2006

2004

2002

2000

References

North Carolina House districts
Wilson County, North Carolina
Nash County, North Carolina